Brignoles is a commune in the Var department in the Provence-Alpes-Côte d'Azur region of Southeastern France. Alongside Draguignan, it is one of two subprefectures in Var.

It was the summer residence of the counts of Provence; their castle dates from the thirteenth century. In 2017, the commune of Brignoles had a population of 17,179.

Population

Notable people 

It was the birthplace of:
 Antoine Albalat (1856–1935), writer specialising in French literature.
 Louis of Toulouse (1274–1297), bishop of Toulouse.
 François de Porchères d'Arbaud, (1590-1640), poet
  (1768-1821), French soldier.
  (1803–1874), poet and author.
 Fabrice Hadjadj (born 1971), philosopher and dramatist, teacher at the Lycée Sainte Jeanne d'Arc since 2002.
  (born 1965), French film director.
 Joseph-Louis Lambot (1814–1887), the inventor of ferro-cement which led to the development of reinforced concrete. 
 Catherine Matausch (born 1960), French journalist.
 Jean-Baptiste Maunier (born 1990), French actor.
  (1944–2009), French musician, died and buried in Brignoles.
 Victor Nicolas (1906–1979), French sculptor who created many monuments in nearby departments.
 Joseph Parrocel (1646–1704), French painter.
  (born 1965), French film director and screenwriter.
 François Just Marie Raynouard, (1761-1836) a French dramatist, linguist, writer and philologist.

Sport 
 Amy Cissé (born 1969), retired international basketball player.
  (born 1955), retired rugby union player.
 Jean-Jacques Marcel (1931–2014), French footballer.
 Patrick Valéry (born 1969), retired footballer.

Twin towns and sister cities
Brignoles is twinned with:

 Bruneck, Italy
 Groß-Gerau, Germany
 Szamotuły, Poland
 Tielt, Belgium

See also
 Communes of the Var department

References

External links

 Official website of Brignoles 
 Tourist Office
 

Communes of Var (department)
Var communes articles needing translation from French Wikipedia
French Riviera
Subprefectures in France